An election was held on Tuesday, November 3, 2020, to elect the non-voting delegate to the United States House of Representatives from American Samoa's at-large congressional district. The election coincided with races for other federal and American Samoan territorial offices, including the larger American Samoa general election, as well as the nationwide 2020 United States House of Representatives elections and the 2020 United States general elections. 

Incumbent delegate, Rep. Amata Coleman Radewagen, a Republican who had held the seat since 2015, was overwhelmingly re-elected to the United States House of Representatives for a fourth term.

Background
In November 2014, Amata Coleman Radewagen defeated 10-term incumbent Democratic Rep. Eni Faleomavaega in a crowded race for the seat. She won re-election to a third term in 2018.

Candidates
The deadline for candidates to file with the Election Office was September 1, 2020. Three candidates filed to run for election to American Samoa's lone seat in the United States House of Representatives by the official deadline, as determined by Chief Election Officer, Dr. Lealofi Uiagalelei.  A fourth candidate, Lealofi Seau, a retired member of the United States military, announced his candidacy in July 2020, but did not qualify for the ballot by the deadline.

Democratic
Oreta Tufuga Mapu Crichton, former Chief Procurement Officer (CPO) for the American Samoan Government (ASG) from 2015 until July 2020.
Crichton resigned as CPO on July 17, 2020, to seek election for Delegate. She officially launched her campaign on September 12, 2020

Meleagi Suitonu-Chapman, retired U.S. federal government employee
Suitonu-Chapman launched her campaign in July 2020, marking her fourth campaign for Delegate to the U.S. House. She most recently ran for the office in 2018. Suitonu-Chapman announced her candidacy in San Diego, California, as COVID-19 travel restrictions prevented her from returning to American Samoa at the time, and she remained stranded on the United States mainland for the duration of the election.

Republican
Amata Coleman Radewagen, incumbent Delegate in the United States House of Representatives
Announced her intention to seek re-election in June 2020

General election results

References

American Samoa
2020
House